Nambikkai Foundation is a charitable trust providing vocational training for adult deaf in South India.

The word Nambikkai means 'Hope' in Tamil.

Started in 1978 by Ian and Sue Stillman, the project is based on a 60+ acre farm located 13 kilometers from the southernmost tip of India. One of the main aims of the charity is to bring services for the deaf to the more rural and isolated  areas of India where none had existed before despite a huge demand. Nambikkai works to train adult deaf students in skills that can be useful in their own communities, and can them lead independent lives.  The work is sponsored, in part, by the Carey Baptist Church in Reading, England.

One of Nambikkai's long-term goals is to create a community for deaf individuals or families who struggle to integrate into mainstream society.

References

Charities based in India
Deafness charities